The men's qualification rounds at the 2015 World Artistic Gymnastics Championships took place on October 25–26, 2015 in the SSE Hydro in Glasgow. The top 8 teams advanced to team finals and guaranteed Olympic team berths; teams 9–16 qualified to the Olympic test event in early 2016 to compete for the final 4 team spots.

Team

Individual all-around

Floor

Pommel horse

Rings

Vault

Parallel bars

Horizontal bar

References

Men's qualification